Melanie Cecelia du Bois, is a South African actress. She is best known for the roles in Arendsvlei, 7de Laan and Sterk Skemer.

Personal life
Du Bois was born in Riverlea, Johannesburg, South Africa. In 2016, she has opened up that she is struggling with bipolar disorder, particularly after the death of her sister and her divorce. On 3 January 2015, her 23-year-old nephew Michael died by hanging himself with his own T-shirt. Michael was the son of Melanie's older sister, Lucia Wilson. On 7 January 2015, struggling with the lost, Lucia later suicide by hanging as well at the age of 46.

Career
She completed a diploma in Public Relations from the Technikon Witwatersrand. After that, she completed a diploma in Drama from the Trinity College London later did an Associates Teachers Diploma in Drama from the Trinity College London.

In 2009, she joined the cast of the SABC2 Afrikaans soapie, 7de Laan. She continued to play the role of fashion designer "Felicity Daniels" for 7 consecutive years until 2016. In 2017 she acted in the SABC3 comedy-drama Soap on a Rope and played the role as "Zee". In 2018, she played the sub-lead role "Ronel Foster" in the kykNET & kie soap opera Arendsvlei. Apart from that, she voiced in the telenovela Doodsondes for the role of "Lal Uzun", played by Tugce Kocak. In 2013, she was nominated for the Kids Choice Award for the Best Actress and later nominated for the Tempo Award for th Best Actress for her role in 7de Laan.

Filmography

References

External links
 

Living people
South African television actresses
1988 births